Seven Wishes or 7 Wishes may refer to:

7 Wishes (Night Ranger album), a 1985 album by Night Ranger
7 Wishes (Shana Morrison album), a 2001 album by Shana Morrison
Siedem życzeń (Seven Wishes), a Polish TV series

See also
Three wishes (disambiguation)